Benjamin Sniddlegrass and the Cauldron of Penguins is a 2011 Australian parody film inspired by the Kermode and Mayo film review programme. It is a parody of the Harry Potter films yet it also contains many jokes related to the radio programme. The film's name comes from a critical review by Kermode of the film Percy Jackson & the Olympians: The Lightning Thief.

Plot

The film opens with a prologue narrated by Stephen Fry, introducing the audience to Benjamin Sniddlegass (Andrew Griscti), a nerdy redheaded orphan from Cockfosters, UK, who lives with his domineering Aunt David Morrissey (Linda Newstead).

After discovering his Aunt has been hiding packages addressed to him, he sneaks down to the mailbox one morning and finds an envelope containing an iPhone, which teleports him to Luna Park in Sydney, Australia. He's met by Mr. Pentangle (Alec Doomadgee), an imposing Aboriginal man, who reveals that Ben is part of an ancient magical sect of Wittertainers.

The pair journey to a small island off the Australian coast, which is home to Fairport Academy, the magic school that Ben will be attending. While moving into his dorm, Ben meets Scarlett McKenna (Catherine Davies), a gorgeous co-ed a few years his senior, who casts a spell curing his near-sightedness.

At the school assembly, Ben is ignored by the student population, but Scarlett comforts him. The new principal, Bavarian filmmaker Werner Herzog (Dorian Newstead), gives the opening address, warning the students that changes will be made with him in charge.

A musical montage shows the next three months of Ben's school life. His initial classes with Professor Mumblecore are a disaster, and Ben is the subject of humiliating gossip among his fellow students. He takes advantage of a history project to deliver a presentation on his idol, skiffle legend Johnny Leroy, which wins over his classmates, who applaud him enthusiastically.

A chat between Ben and Scarlett shows their relationship beginning to grow closer, as Ben's confidence has grown. He is outfitted with a new wardrobe, and is given a suit belonging to his father as a going away present from Pentangle, who is swimming to Germany to take up his new post as headmaster of Werner Herzog's Rogue Film School.

Ben visits Principal Herzog, curious about the history of his family. Herzog tells Ben of his early life, fighting alongside Ben's father Percy (also Andrew Griscti), a secret agent employed by the British government. Percy's career was focused on defeating the machinations of the sinister Lord Emmerich, a vicious mastermind with the head of a gorilla.

In a flashback, Ben's mother Lucy (Sarah Linnegar) is held hostage by Lord Emmerich in his lair, inside a hollowed out Icelandic volcano. Percy breaks into the facility and confronts Emmerich, defeating him and rescuing his bride. Sensing his defeat, Emmerich sets the self-destruct sequence, causing the volcano to erupt and kill them all.

Ben relates his troubles to Scarlett over a game of billiards in the Fairport Academy bar. She reveals she lusted after Ben's father when she was growing up, and they trade innuendo as she beats him decisively. As they get more and more drunk, she delivers a rambling speech to him about hero worship and they almost kiss.

The next morning, Ben invites Scarlett down to the disused concert hall, and shows her his plan to resurrect the school's tradition of concerts, which used to be filled by the ghosts of dead rock stars. Ben's strategy is to run school talent quests, then start to bring in notable living performers, like Bruce Springsteen. An impressed Scarlett joins Ben on the stage and they perform a duet of the Fairport Academy School Song.

The print becomes scratchy and is replaced by a technical difficulties card. The projectionist (Max Newstead) phones the director of the film (Jeremy Dylan) and explains that he's lost the next two reels of the film. Dylan is concerned that this skips a number of important plot points, but they conclude that no one will notice. Kenneth restarts the projector.

Elvis Costello and Paul McCartney have just left the stage as Ben concludes his performance at the school talent quest to rapturous applause. Later, Ben sleeps uneasily.

Ben dreams he's back in the concert hall, watching Johnny Leroy and the Impulsives perform on stage. In the second verse, Leroy transforms into the Lord Emmerich, who leaps down from the stage and menaces Ben, demanding to know the 'secret of the cauldron of penguins'.

Ben awakes with a start. Scarlett comes to his door to check on him, but Ben assures her it was merely a bad dream. A concerned Scarlett calls Pentangle in Germany and relays the news.

Ben is plagued by another dream involving Lord Emmerich and the Cauldron of Penguins, this time more violent, and awakes in a panic. Scarlett comes to his door again, more concerned, and they sit together in his room and resolve to go to Principal Herzog for advice. She comforts him and they have sex.

In his office the next morning, Herzog tells Ben of his concern that Emmerich is using Ben's dreams as a way to regain a footing in the physical world. The only solution is to keep Ben awake indefinitely and Herzog concocts a mixture of energy drinks, coffee and cocaine that Ben reluctantly drinks.

He heads to the school library with the mixture, researching penguins in hopes of discovering the solution to the mystery of the cauldron. As he ingests more the mixture and stays awake longer, he begins hallucinating a talking stuffed penguin (Lauren McKenna), who mocks him. Ben punches him repeatedly in the face.

Two weeks later, a concerned Pentangle arrives at the library, searching for Ben, who has become totally unhinged. Pentangle cleans him up and tells him that Scarlett and Herzog have been kidnapped by Lord Emmerich, and together they search for clues where they were last seen. Ben finds an iPhone and uses the transporter app to follow them.

He appears in Lord Emmerich's hollowed out Icelandic volcano lair, an exact replica of the room where he faced off with Ben's parents. Scarlett is bound and gagged on an operating table and Emmerich stands over her, threatening them with a pistol. He removes his gorilla mask to reveal that he is really Werner Herzog, who created the fictional persona of an eccentric Bavarian filmmaker to escape the authorities after surviving the destruction of his old lair. He reveals his overly elaborate plan in a long-winded speech, then prepares to shoot them both dead. Ben, remembering the layout from the earlier flashback sequence, activates the self-destruct sequence and transports himself and Scarlett to safety.

Cast
 Stephen Fry as the Narrator.
 Andrew Griscti as Benjamin and Percy Sniddlegrass
 Catherine Davies as Scarlett McKenna
 Dorian Newstead as Werner Herzog
 Alec Doomadgee as Mr. Pentangle
 Linda Newstead as Aunt David Morrissey
 Sarah Linnegar as Lucy Sniddlegrass
 Jon Sewell as Johnny Leroy
 Lol McKenna as the voices of Lord Emmerich and the Penguin.
 Riley Maher and Tim Sampson as the Impulsives
 Isaac Owen as Professor Mumblecore
 Max Newstead as Kenneth, the projectionist
 Yavor Dimitrov as Asshole
 Jeremy Dylan as himself

Production history

In his review of the film Percy Jackson & the Olympians: The Lightning Thief, BBC radio film critic Mark Kermode remarked that the general plot of the film was so similar to the Harry Potter series that it may as well have been called Benjamin Sniddlegrass and the Cauldron of Penguins. His co-host Simon Mayo declared that he wanted to see that film.

In Australia, music video director Jeremy Dylan created a mock poster for the film and uploaded it to a blog at benjaminsniddlegrass.com, which was discovered by fans of the show, who sent it in, along with Dylan's subsequent mock press releases about the film, into the show. Mayo read some of Dylan's work out on 26 February and he and Kermode encouraged Dylan to make the film.

Assembling a cast made up of performers from amateur musical theater societies around Sydney and penning the screenplay himself, Dylan and his production team started shooting on 6 June 2010 and shot the film over seven days between June and mid-October. Locations included The Exchange Hotel, Epping Boys High School and a motel which was used for the school dormitories.

Stephen Fry is a known listener to the Mayo and Kermode show and when he travelled to Sydney in August 2010, Jeremy Dylan approached him about narrating the film by passing a copy of the screenplay to him at the end of his one-man show at the Sydney Opera House. The show was filmed by the ABC and Dylan can be seen doing so in the television special made of the show. Two days later, Fry emailed Dylan and invited him to come to his hotel with his recording equipment. The narration was recorded that afternoon.

The film's score was provided by Mike Carr, a Golden Guitar winning singer-songwriter active in the country music industry. Carr also wrote one of the original songs featured in the film, 'Famous'. Along with 'Bad Man', the main title theme, and 'Judgement Day', another skiffle song, the original songs were recorded in a studio in Riverwood, produced by Dylan and the engineer, Jeff Cripps. The songs were performed live by the actors who portray Johnny Leroy and the Impulsives in the film, in an attempt to emulate the early Elvis Presley Sun Studio recordings.

The cinematographer, Yavor Dimitrov, was studying at UTS when the film was in production, and owned the camera the film was shot on. He became a producer on the film as production wore on.

When the film was completed, Dylan was interviewed on the Mayo/Kermode show, promoting the film's theatrical premiere in Sydney the following week. The premiere was held on 31 January 2011, at the Dendy Cinema, Newtown, to a sold-out house, and the DVD and digital download of the film became available immediately afterward. The film was subsequently screened at the State Theatre in Hobart.

Reception
The film was reviewed by Kermode the week following the premiere, where he expressed ambivalence about the film, but admitted to laughing "six or seven times".

References

External links
 
 
 BSATCOP at Seven Shells Media.

2011 films
Australian comedy films
Australian independent films
2010s English-language films